Jimmy Copeland (23 August 1941 – 23 July 2018) was a Scottish footballer, who played for Kilmarnock, Dumbarton, Montrose and Clyde in the Scottish Football League.

Copeland died in July 2018, aged 76.

References

1941 births
2018 deaths
Scottish footballers
Dumbarton F.C. players
Kilmarnock F.C. players
Montrose F.C. players
Clyde F.C. players
Scottish Football League players
Association football forwards
Place of birth missing
Place of death missing
Footballers from Dumfries and Galloway